Mayrand may refer to:

People
Edward Mayrand (1947–2011), American serial killer
Étienne Mayrand (1776–1872), Quebec businessman and politician
Georges Mayrand (1876–1951), Canadian politician in Quebec
Hormidas Mayrand (1858–1928), Canadian politician in Quebec
Marc Mayrand, Canadian Chief Electoral Officer

Place
Roche-Charles-la-Mayrand, commune in France